The 2014 Formula 3 Brazil Open was the fifth Formula 3 Brazil Open race held at Autódromo José Carlos Pace from January 16–19, 2014.

Drivers and teams

 All cars are powered by Berta engines, and will run on Pirelli tyres.

Classification

Qualifying

Race 1

Race 2

Pre-final Grid

Pre-final Race (Race 3)

Final Race (Race 4)

See also
 Formula 3 Sudamericana
 Fórmula 3 Brasil
 Formula Three

References

External links
Official website of the Formula 3 Brazil Open

Formula 3 Brazil Open
Formula 3 Brazil Open
Brazil Open
Brazil F3